The ISF Men's Fastpitch World Cup is a fastpitch softball tournament for men's national teams and men's club teams held by the International Softball Federation (ISF).

Results

Medal table

References

World championships in softball